Sombrerillito Creek is a small stream of water located in Webb County, Texas which runs through Laredo, Texas. The creek is formed 13 miles north of Laredo and runs southwest for 16 miles until connecting to the Rio Grande. Sombrerillito Creek was dammed in northwest Laredo to form Sombrerillito Creek Lake, the third largest lake in Laredo. The terrain surrounding the creek is mostly clay and sandy loams. The vegetation surrounding the creek is mostly made up of mesquite, cacti, chaparral, hardwoods and grasses. Sombrerillito Creek crosses one major highway in Laredo, Texas among them are: Farm to Market Road 1472.

Coordinates
 Source:  Webb County, Texas
 Mouth:  Rio Grande at Laredo, Texas

See also
 List of rivers of Texas
 List of tributaries of the Rio Grande

References

Tributaries of the Rio Grande
Geography of Laredo, Texas
Rivers of Texas